James Bowman (October 31, 1861 – May 2, 1940) was a politician and farmer. Born in Morris Township, Canada West, he was later elected to the House of Commons of Canada in 1911 as a member of the Conservative Party to represent the riding of Huron East. He was re-elected in the 1917 election as a Unionist to represent Huron North. Prior to his federal political experience, he was reeve of Morris Township (1897–1898) and councillor (1892–1896) then councillor of Huron County, Ontario (1899–1905).

External links
 

1861 births
1940 deaths
Conservative Party of Canada (1867–1942) MPs
Members of the House of Commons of Canada from Ontario
Unionist Party (Canada) MPs